Marry the Girl is a 1937 American romantic comedy film directed by William C. McGann. The 68 minute film, set at a newspaper syndicate, was written by Sig Herzig and Pat C. Flick, shot by cinematographer Arthur L. Todd, and was produced by Bryan Foy and Jack L. Warner under the Warner Bros. banner.

Plot summary

Ollie Radway (Mary Boland) is a daffy dowager who, with equally eccentric brother John (Hugh Herbert), runs a thriving newspaper. After firing the managing editor for failing to keep her niece Virginia (Carol Hughes) out of the newspaper business, she hands the job to David Partridge (Frank McHugh), a minor employee with a crush on the girl. In short order, Partridge is assigned to keep Virginia away from fortune-hunting editorial artist Dimitri Kyeff (Mischa Auer).

Cast
 Mary Boland as Ollie Radway
 Frank McHugh as David 'Party' Partridge
 Hugh Herbert as John B. Radway
 Carol Hughes as Virginia Radway
 Allen Jenkins as Specs
 Mischa Auer as Dimitri Kyeff
 Alan Mowbray as Dr. Hayden Stryker
 Hugh O'Connell as Michael 'Mike' Forrester
 Teddy Hart as Biff
 Tom Kennedy as Jasper
 Dewey Robinson as Buster
 Arthur Aylesworth as Third Southerner
 Olin Howland as First Southerner
 William B. Davidson as Drake 
 Charles Judels as Andre Victor Antoine Descate

References

External links
 
 
 
 

American romantic comedy films
1937 romantic comedy films
1937 films
American black-and-white films
Films directed by William C. McGann
Films about journalists
Warner Bros. films
1930s American films